Hymenobacter ruber  is a Gram-negative, aerobic, non-spore-forming, rod-shaped and non-motile bacterium from the genus of Hymenobacter which has been isolated from grass soil.

References 

ruber
Bacteria described in 2014